John Gutzon de la Mothe Borglum (March 25, 1867 – March 6, 1941) was an American sculptor best known for his work on Mount Rushmore. He is also associated with various other public works of art across the U.S., including Stone Mountain in Georgia, the statue of Union General Philip Sheridan in Washington, D.C., as well as a bust of Abraham Lincoln which was exhibited in the White House by Theodore Roosevelt and which is now held in the United States Capitol crypt in Washington, D.C.

Early life
The son of Danish immigrants, Gutzon Borglum was born in 1867 in St. Charles in what was then Idaho Territory. Borglum was a child of Mormon polygamy. His father, Jens Møller Haugaard Børglum (1839–1909), came from the village of Børglum in northwestern Denmark. He had two wives when he lived in Idaho: Gutzon's mother, Christina Mikkelsen Børglum (1847–1871), and her sister Ida, who was Jens's first wife.  Jens Borglum decided to leave the LDS church and moved to Omaha, Nebraska where polygamy was both illegal and taboo. Jens Borglum had worked mainly as a woodcarver before his decision to attend the Saint Louis Homeopathic Medical College in St. Louis, Missouri. At this point "Jens and Christina divorced, the family left the LDS church, and Jens, Ida, their children, and Christina's two sons, Gutzon and Solon, moved to St. Louis, where Jens earned a medical degree."  Upon his graduation from the Missouri Medical College in 1874, Dr. Borglum moved the family to Fremont, Nebraska, where he established a medical practice.    Gutzon Borglum remained in Fremont until 1882, when his father enrolled him in St. Mary's College, Kansas.

After a brief stint at Saint Mary's College, Gutzon Borglum moved to Omaha, Nebraska, where he apprenticed in a machine shop and graduated from Creighton Preparatory School.

New York City
Back in the U.S. in New York City, he sculpted saints and apostles for the new Cathedral of St. John the Divine in 1901; in 1906 he had a group sculpture accepted by the Metropolitan Museum of Art— the first sculpture by a living American the museum had ever purchased—and made his presence further felt with some portraits.  He also won the Logan Medal of the Arts. His reputation soon surpassed that of his younger brother Solon Borglum, already an established sculptor.

Family
Borglum married Mary Montgomery Williams, on May 20, 1909, with whom he had three children, including a son, Lincoln, and a daughter, Mary Ellis (Mel) Borglum Vhay (1916–2002).

Public life
Borglum was active in the committee that organized the New York Armory Show of 1913, the birthplace of modernism in American art. By the time the show was ready to open, however, Borglum had resigned from the committee, feeling that the emphasis on avant-garde works had co-opted the original premise of the show and made traditional artists like himself look provincial. He moved into an estate in Stamford, Connecticut in 1914 and lived there for 10 years. He sheltered Czechoslovak Legion members on his land at Stamford in 1917.

Borglum was an active member of the Ancient Free and Accepted Masons (the Freemasons), raised in Howard Lodge #35, New York City, on June 10, 1904, and serving as its Worshipful Master 1910–11. In 1915, he was appointed Grand Representative of the Grand Lodge of Denmark near the Grand Lodge of New York. He received his Scottish Rite Degrees in the New York City Consistory on October 25, 1907.  He was friends with Theodore Roosevelt for many years and during the 1912 United States presidential election Borglum was a very active campaign organizer and member of the Bull Moose Party.

While it has been claimed that Borglum was a member of the Ku Klux Klan, an article in the Smithsonian Magazine denies that there is proof that he officially joined the KKK. That said, he became "deeply involved in Klan politics", attending Klan rallies and serving on Klan committees. In 1925, having only completed the head of Robert E. Lee, Borglum was dismissed from the Stone Mountain project, with some holding that it came about due to infighting within the KKK, with Borglum involved in the strife. Later, he stated "I am not a member of the Kloncilium, nor a knight of the KKK," but Howard Shaff and Audrey Karl Shaff claim that "that was for public consumption." The museum at Mount Rushmore displays a letter to Borglum from D. C. Stephenson, the infamous Klan Grand Dragon who later was convicted of the rape and murder of Madge Oberholtzer. The 8x10 foot portrait contains the inscription "To my good friend Gutzon Borglum, with the greatest respect." Correspondence from Borglum to Stephenson during the 1920s detailed a deep racist conviction in Nordic moral superiority and strict immigration policies.

Monuments
A fascination with gigantic scale and themes of heroic nationalism suited his extroverted personality. His head of Abraham Lincoln, carved from a six-ton block of marble, was exhibited in Theodore Roosevelt's White House and can be found in the United States Capitol Crypt in Washington, D.C. A "patriot," believing that the "monuments we have built are not our own," he looked to create art that was "American, drawn from American sources, memorializing American achievement," according to a 1908 interview. Borglum was highly suited to the competitive environment surrounding the contracts for public buildings and monuments, and his public sculptures are found all around the United States.

In 1908, Borglum won a competition for an equestrian statue of the Civil War General Philip Sheridan to be placed in Sheridan Circle in Washington, D.C. A second version of General Philip Sheridan was erected in Chicago, Illinois, in 1923. Winning this competition was a personal triumph for him because he won out over sculptor J.Q.A. Ward, a much older and more established artist and one whom Borglum had clashed with earlier in regard to the National Sculpture Society. At the unveiling of the Sheridan statue, one observer, President Theodore Roosevelt (whom Borglum was later to include in the Mount Rushmore portrait group), declared that it was "first rate"; a critic wrote that "as a sculptor Gutzon Borglum was no longer a rumor, he was a fact." (Smith:see References)

President Franklin D. Roosevelt delivered an address on May 3, 1934 dedicating a statue of William Jennings Bryan created by Borglum. This Bryan statue by Borglum originally stood in Washington, D.C. but was displaced by highway construction moved by an Act of Congress in 1961 to Salem, Illinois, Bryan's birthplace.

In 1925, the sculptor moved to Texas to work on the monument to trail drivers commissioned by the Trail Drivers Association. He completed the model in 1925, but due to lack of funds it was not cast until 1940, and then was only a fourth its originally planned size. It stands in front of the Texas Pioneer and Trail Drivers Memorial Hall next to the Witte Museum in San Antonio. Borglum lived at the historic Menger Hotel, which in the 1920s was the residence of a number of artists. He subsequently planned the redevelopment of the Corpus Christi waterfront; the plan failed, although a model for a statue of Christ intended for it was later modified by his son and erected on a mountaintop in South Dakota. While living and working in Texas, Borglum took an interest in local beautification. He promoted change and modernity, although he was berated by academicians.

Stone Mountain

Borglum was initially involved in the carving of Stone Mountain in Georgia. Borglum's nativist stances made him seem an ideologically sympathetic choice to carve a memorial to heroes of the Confederate States of America, planned for Stone Mountain, Georgia. Borglum accepted, but told the committee, "Ladies, a twenty-foot head of Lee on that mountainside would look like a postage stamp on a barn door."

Borglum's ideas eventually evolved into a high-relief frieze of Lee, Jefferson Davis, and Stonewall Jackson riding around the mountain, followed by a legion of artillery troops. Borglum agreed to include a Ku Klux Klan altar in his plans for the memorial to acknowledge a request of Helen Plane in 1915, who wrote to him: "I feel it is due to the KKK that saved us from Negro domination and carpetbag rule, that it be immortalized on Stone Mountain".

After a delay caused by World War I, Borglum and the newly chartered Stone Mountain Confederate Monumental Association set to work on this monument, the largest ever attempted. Many difficulties slowed progress, some because of the sheer scale involved. After finishing the detailed model of the carving, Borglum was unable to trace the figures onto the massive area on which he was working, until he developed a gigantic magic lantern to project the image onto the side of the mountain.

Carving officially began on June 23, 1923, with Borglum making the first cut. At Stone Mountain he developed sympathetic connections with the reorganized Ku Klux Klan, who were major financial backers of the monument. Lee's head was unveiled on Lee's birthday January 19, 1924, to a large crowd, but soon thereafter Borglum was increasingly at odds with the officials of the organization. His domineering, perfectionist, authoritarian manner brought tensions to such a point that in March 1925 Borglum smashed his clay and plaster models.  He left Georgia permanently, his tenure with the organization over. None of his work remains, as it was all blasted off the mountain's face for the work of Borglum's replacement Henry Augustus Lukeman. In his abortive attempt, however, Borglum had developed the necessary techniques for sculpting on a gigantic scale that made Mount Rushmore possible.

Mount Rushmore

His Mount Rushmore project, 1927–1941, was the brainchild of South Dakota state historian Doane Robinson. His first attempt with the face of Thomas Jefferson had to be redone when it was determined that there was not enough stone to complete it. Dynamite was used to remove large areas of rock from under Washington's brow. The initial pair of presidents, George Washington and Thomas Jefferson, was soon joined by Abraham Lincoln and Theodore Roosevelt. 

Ivan Houser, father of John Sherrill Houser, was assistant sculptor to Gutzon Borglum in the early years of carving; he began working with Borglum shortly after the inception of the monument and was with Borglum for a total of seven years. When Houser left Gutzon to devote his talents to his own work, Gutzon's son, Lincoln, took over as Assistant-Sculptor to his father.

Borglum alternated exhausting on-site supervising with world tours, raising money, polishing his personal legend, sculpting a Thomas Paine memorial for Paris and a Woodrow Wilson memorial for Poznań, Poland (1931). In his absence, work at Mount Rushmore was overseen by Bill Tallman and later his son, Lincoln Borglum. During the Rushmore project, father and son were residents of Beeville, Texas. When he died in Chicago, following complications of surgery, his son finished another season at Rushmore, but left the monument largely in the state of completion it had reached under his father's direction.

Other works

In 1909, the sculpture Rabboni was created as a grave site for the Ffoulke Family in Washington, D.C. at Rock Creek Cemetery.

Four public works by Borglum are in Newark, New Jersey: Seated Lincoln (1911), Indian and the Puritan (1916), Wars of America (1926), and a stele with bas-relief, First Landing Party of the Founders of Newark (1916).

In 1912, the Nathaniel Wheeler Memorial Fountain was dedicated in Bridgeport, Connecticut.

Memorial to Robert Louis Stevenson at Baker Cottage, Saranac Lake, New York. Unveiled in 1915.

In 1918, he was one of the drafters of the Czechoslovak declaration of independence.

One of Borglum's more unusual pieces is the Aviator completed in 1919 as a memorial for James Rogers McConnell, who was killed in World War I while flying for the Lafayette Escadrille. It is located on the grounds of the University of Virginia in Charlottesville, Virginia.

In 1922, he crafted a sculpture of William D. Hoard in what is now the Henry Mall Historic District on the campus of the University of Wisconsin.

His statue of Collis P. Huntington was completed in 1924 and stands at the entrance of the CSX Huntington headquarters building located in the 900 block of Seventh Avenue Huntington, West Virginia.

His statue of Harvey W. Scott was completed in 1933 and stood at the peak of Mount Tabor, Portland, Oregon until it was toppled by protestors in 2020.

Borglum sculpted the Memorial to the "Start Westward of the United States", which is located in  Muskingum Park, Marietta, Ohio (1938). The work was featured on a 1938 3¢ US postage stamp.

He built the statue of Daniel Butterfield at Sakura Park  in Manhattan (1918).

He created a memorial to Sacco and Vanzetti (1928), a plaster cast of which is now in the Boston Public Library.

Another Borglum design is the North Carolina Monument on Seminary Ridge at the Gettysburg Battlefield in south-central Pennsylvania. The cast bronze sculpture depicts a wounded Confederate officer encouraging his men to push forward during Pickett's Charge. Borglum had also made arrangements for an airplane to fly over the monument during the dedication ceremony on July 3, 1929. During the sculpture's unveiling, the plane scattered roses across the field as a salute to those North Carolinians who had fought and died at Gettysburg.

In 1939 when German troops marched into Poland they destroyed Borglum's statue of Woodrow Wilson located in Poznań.

Death
Borglum died in 1941 of a heart attack and is interred at Forest Lawn Memorial Park in Glendale, California.

In popular culture
 Historian Simon Schama, in his Landscape and Memory, discusses Borglum's life and work.

Publications

Gallery

See also
 Statue of John Campbell Greenway
 Sierra Madre, California
 James Patterson
 Chris Grabenstein

References

Other sources

External links

Borglum biography  American Experience
"Stone Mountain" Sketch
Out of Rushmore's Shadow: The Artistic Development of Gutzon Borglum, Stamford, Connecticut Museum,1999/2000
Mount Rushmore/Gutzon Borglum Museum in Keystone, SD
John William Mackay statue,  Reno, NV
 at History Nebraska
A Sculptor Left His Mark on Newark
John Taliaferro on Great White Fathers: The Story of the Obsessive Quest to Create Mt. Rushmore, December 15, 2002. Booknotes interview
Mountain Sculpture by Gutzon Borglum, Dupont Magazine, Summer 1932 
Gutzon Borglum House (1924–1925), Avondale Estates, Georgia (historical marker)

1867 births
1941 deaths
Académie Julian alumni
American people of Danish descent
Art Students League of New York faculty
Sculptors from Connecticut
Artists from Idaho
Artists from Nebraska
Burials at Forest Lawn Memorial Park (Glendale)
Mount Rushmore
People from Bear Lake County, Idaho
San Francisco Art Institute alumni
20th-century American sculptors
20th-century American male artists
19th-century American sculptors
19th-century American male artists
American male sculptors
Former Latter Day Saints
Sculptors from New York (state)
Stone Mountain
People from Fremont, Nebraska
American currency designers
Coin designers
Sculptors from Idaho